Benton Township is the name of some places in the U.S. state of Pennsylvania:
Benton Township, Columbia County, Pennsylvania
Benton Township, Lackawanna County, Pennsylvania

Pennsylvania township disambiguation pages